The 2008 Popular Democratic Party primaries were the primary elections by which voters of the Popular Democratic Party (PPD) chose its nominees for various political offices of Puerto Rico for the 2008 general elections. They were held on March 9, 2008. Incumbent Governor Aníbal Acevedo Vilá faced no opposition for his candidacy, making him the official candidate for the elections.

Background

At the time of the primaries, incumbent Governor Aníbal Acevedo Vilá was allegedly being investigated by federal authorities for allegations of irregularities in his campaign finances. However, despite this, the party supported his candidacy for Governor.

Also, one of the most contested campaigns was the one for Mayor of Ponce, with incumbent Francisco Zayas Seijo facing the former administrator of the city, Carlos Jirau.

Candidates

Senate

At-large

 Eduardo Bhatia
 Juan Cancel Alegría
 Víctor de la Cruz
 Landy Fabre
 Antonio Fas Alzamora
 Alejandro García Padilla

 Sila Mari González Calderón
 Juan Eugenio Hernández Mayoral
 Rafael Irizarri
 Margarita Ostolaza
 Cirilo Tirado Rivera
 Roberto Vigoreaux

District
The Popular Democratic Party held primaries on only 4 of the 8 senatorial districts.

Arecibo
 Wanda Arroyo
 Javier Cruz
 María Elena
 Edgar A. Martínez
 Francis Rivera
 Iván Serrano Cordero

Mayagüez-Aguadilla
 Robin H. Montes
 Sergio Ortíz
 Omar Soto
 Enid Toro de Báez

Ponce
 Modesto Agosto Alicea
 José Luis Galarza
 Bruno Ramos
 José H. Rivera
 Rafael Santiago

Guayama
 Luis Guillermo Febus
 Eder Ortíz Ortíz
 Angel M. Rodríguez

House of Representatives

At-large

 Jorge Colberg Toro
 Ulises Dalmau
 Héctor Ferrer
 Brenda López de Arrarás
 Jeanette Miranda
 Julio Muñoz
 Angel Ortíz

 Jaime Perelló
 Coco Ríos
 Frankie Rodríguez
 Ramón Ruíz Nieves
 José Segui
 Luis Vega Ramos
 Carmen Yulín Cruz

District
The Popular Democratic Party held primaries on 24 of the 40 representative districts.

District 3
 Ruthy Currás
 Herminio Pagán

District 11
 Ricky Arrillaga
 Rafael Hernández

District 12
 Jorge Avilés
 Eliezer Burgos
 Claudio Ferrer, Jr.
 Remberto Rodríguez

District 13
 Benny Collazo
 Felix Pagán
 Víctor Rodríguez
 Amadis Ulises

District 14
 Vángelo Figueroa
 Felix Rosario
 Juan R. Torres

District 16
 Tony Rodríguez
 Juan Vega Salamanca

District 17
 Moisés Acevedo
 Armando Franco
 Alfredo González
 Héctor Mol Ibañez

District 18
 Luis "Chivita" González
 Concepción Salas
 Solá
 María Vargas

District 20
 Elvin Camacho
 Luis Ramírez
 Jorgito Ramos
 Eduardo Rosado

District 21
 Naida Mateo
 Lydia Méndez Silva
 Rafy Nazario

District 22
 Juan O. Alicea
 Georgie González

District 23
 Wilo Beltrán
 Rafael A. García

District 24
 Ramón Borrero
 Luis Farinacci
 Vilma Flores
 Ferdinand Martínez
 Vangie Rivera

District 25
 Edgar Manolo Avilés
 Jorge Miranda
 Piro Reyes
 Víctor Vassallo

District 26
 John Avilés
 Juan Carlos Figueroa
 Gamalier Pagán

District 27
 Carmen Iris González
 Carlos Luis Torres
 Pito Torres

District 28
 Jorge I. Agosto
 Frankie Cuadrado
 Remesal
 Rosendo
 Luis Santiago

District 29
 Félix Agosto
 Heric Colón
 José R. Varela

District 30
 Rey Alomar
 Eduardo Cintrón
 Migdalia Díaz
 Domingo Torres

District 33
 Héctor Carrasquillo
 Gilbert

District 34
 George Soto
 Juan Pedro

District 35
 Narden Jaime Espinosa
 Ricardo Fernández
 Freddy
 José Pi Báez
 José "Tony" Reyes
 Valentín Valdés
 William Vázquez

District 36
 Ricky Abreu
 Andújar

District 37
 José Miguel del Valle, Jr.
 Frankie Guerra

Mayors
The Popular Democratic Party held primaries on 23 of 78 municipalities.

Arecibo
 Ramón E. Dasta
 Héctor Rafael

Arroyo
 Eric Bachier Román
 Ricardo Rivera

Canóvanas
 Moisés Castro
 Jesús Rosado

Cataño
 Félix Fuentes
 José Rosario

Ceiba
 Gilberto "Lex" Camacho
 Humberto González
 Abimael Portalatín

Culebra
 Alexis Bermúdez
 Digna Feliciana

Fajardo
 Myrna García
 Norma Guzmán

Florida
 Johnny de León
 Yonatan

Humacao
 Joel Rosario
 Marcelo Trujillo

Juana Díaz
 Luis Angel Cortés
 Ramón Hernández Torres

Lajas
 César Corales
 Marcos "Turin" Irizarry
 Ambrosio Rodríguez

Lares
 Chely
 Rigo Guilloty

Las Marías
 Reinaldo González
 José Javier Rodríguez

Las Piedras
 Nelson Vázquez
 Roberto Velázquez

Loíza
 Julito Osorio
 Maricruz Rivera

Moca
 Wilson Acevedo
 Aida E. González

Naranjito
 Manuel Martínez
 Moncho Padilla
 Víctor Manuel Pérez
 Cheo Rivera
 Jolly Rivera

Ponce
 Carlos Jirau
 Francisco Zayas Seijo

Rincón
 Juan D. Elías
 Carlos López Bonilla

Salinas
 Tony Badé
 Francisco Colón
 Abraham López
 Pedro Santos

Trujillo Alto
 José Luis Cruz Cruz
 Hiram

Utuado
 Jesús Arce
 Ramón Collazo
 Martín Negrón
 Otilio Plaza
 Quitín

Vieques
 Víctor Emeric
 Dámaso Serrano

Results

Senate

At-large

District

Arecibo

Mayagüez-Aguadilla

Ponce

Guayama

House of Representatives

At-large

Aftermath

Acevedo Vilá's candidacy

Several weeks after the primaries, Incumbent Governor and PPD candidate, Aníbal Acevedo Vilá, was officially indicted on 19 counts of campaign finance violations. This put his candidacy in jeopardy, and several candidates where taunted as possible replacements. However, Acevedo Vilá decided to run for reelection, and was openly endorsed by the Party in a massive caucus held at the José Miguel Agrelot Coliseum in April 2008. Acevedo Vilá would lose the 2008 general elections. However, in March 2009, he was found not guilty of all charges by a jury.

Split in Ponce

In the primary for the Mayor of Ponce, incumbent Francisco Zayas Seijo narrowly beat his opponent, former Ponce administrator, Carlos Jirau. Zayas beat Jirau by less than 30 votes. After the defeat, Jirau appealed the primary claiming there were irregularities in the process. He also started an independent movement called Movimiento Autónomo Ponceño. At the 2008 general elections, both Zayas and Jirau were defeated by the PNP candidate Mayita Meléndez. This was the first time a PNP candidate had won in Ponce in more than 20 years.

See also

 New Progressive Party primaries, 2008

References

Primary elections in Puerto Rico
2008 Puerto Rico elections
Popular Democratic Party (Puerto Rico)